Gary DePalma is a retired American soccer midfielder who played professionally in the USL A-League, National Professional Soccer League and second Major Indoor Soccer League.

Youth
DePalma graduated from Upper St. Clair High School.  He attended Virginia Wesleyan College where he was a 1995 NCAA Division III First Team and 1997 Third Team All American soccer player.  Over his four-year collegiate career, DePalma scored 40 goals and added 29 goals in 87 games.

Professional
In 1999, DePalma joined the newly founded Pittsburgh Riverhounds of the USL A-League.  He played for the Riverhounds through the 2004 season.  In the fall of 2000, he went on trial to Polish side Lechia Gdańsk. In February 2001, the Dallas Burn had selected DePalma in the fifth round (fifty-fifth overall) of the 2001 MLS SuperDraft but waived him soon after.  In addition to playing outdoor soccer with the Riverhounds, DePalma had an extensive indoor career as well.  In the fall of 1999, he signed with the Detroit Rockers of the National Professional Soccer League.  He spent the entire 1999–2000 season with the Rockers, but missed half of the 2000–2001 season while in Poland.  The Rockers folded in 2001 and on August 21, 2001, the Philadelphia KiXX selected DePalma with the thirty-third selection of the MISL Dispersal Draft.  DePalma spent two season with the KiXX, winning the 2002  championship.  He did not play during the 2003–2004 indoor season.  In 2004, DePalma was selected by the St. Louis Steamers in the MISL Expansion Draft, but was later dealt via a three-team deal involving Sipho Sibiya and Lee Edgerton to the Cleveland Force on June 11, 2004.  The Philadelphia KiXX acquired the rights to DePalma in the 2005 MISL Dispersal Draft, but did not sign DePalma until January 5, 2006.

References

Major Indoor Soccer League (2001–2008) players
Living people
1976 births
American soccer players
Detroit Rockers players
Cleveland Force (2002–2005 MISL) players
FIU Panthers men's soccer players
National Professional Soccer League (1984–2001) players
Philadelphia KiXX players
Pittsburgh Riverhounds SC players
A-League (1995–2004) players
USL Second Division players
FC Dallas draft picks
Association football midfielders